The 1923 South Carolina Gamecocks football team represented the University of South Carolina during the 1923 Southern Conference football season. Led by fourth-year head coach Sol Metzger, the Gamecocks compiled an overall record of 4–6 with a mark of 0–4 in conference play, tying for 19th place in the SoCon.

Schedule

References

South Carolina
South Carolina Gamecocks football seasons
South Carolina Gamecocks football